Ajulemic acid (1',1'-Dimethylheptyl-delta-8-tetrahydrocannabinol-11-oic acid) (DMH-D8-THC-11-OIC) (AB-III-56, HU-239, IP-751, CPL 7075, CT-3, JBT-101, Anabasum, Resunab, Lenabasum) is a synthetic cannabinoid that shows anti-fibrotic and anti-inflammatory effects in pre-clinical studies without causing a subjective "high". Although its design was inspired by a metabolite of delta-9-THC known as delta-9-THC-11-oic acid, ajulemic acid is an analog of the delta-8-THC metabolite delta-8-THC-11-oic acid. It is being developed for the treatment of inflammatory and fibrotic conditions such as systemic sclerosis, dermatomyositis and cystic fibrosis. It does not share the anti-emetic effects of some other cannabinoids, but may be useful for treating chronic inflammatory conditions where inflammation fails to resolve. Side effects include dry mouth, tiredness, and dizziness. The mechanism of action is through activation of the CB2 receptor leading to production of specialized proresolving eicosanoids such as lipoxin A4 and Prostaglandin J2. Studies in animals at doses up to 40 mg/kg show minimal psychoactivity of ajulemic acid, compared to that produced by tetrahydrocannabinol. A composition of ajulemic acid named Lenabasum (formerly Anabasum, Resunab) is being developed by Corbus Pharmaceuticals (formerly JB Therapeutics) for the treatment of orphan chronic life-threatening inflammatory diseases.

References 

Cannabinoids
Benzochromenes
Carboxylic acids
Phenols
HU cannabinoids